Arylsulfotransferase may refer to:
 Aryl sulfotransferase, an enzyme
 Aryl-sulfate sulfotransferase, an enzyme